Operation Secret is a 1952 American drama film directed by Lewis Seiler and written by Harold Medford and James R. Webb. The film stars Cornel Wilde, Steve Cochran, Phyllis Thaxter, Karl Malden, Paul Picerni and Lester Matthews. The film was released by Warner Bros. on November 8, 1952. The film is based on the exploits of US Marine Corps Major Peter Ortiz.

Plot
While under attack by German forces, a French army unit discovers there is a traitor in their midst, feeding the Germans information.

Cast 
Cornel Wilde as Peter Forrester
Steve Cochran as Marcel Brevoort
Phyllis Thaxter as Maria Corbet
Karl Malden as Maj. Latrec
Paul Picerni as Capt. Armand Dupree
Lester Matthews as Robbins
Dan O'Herlihy as Mike Duncan
Jay Novello as Herr Bauer
Wilton Graff as French Official
Dan Riss as German Sergeant
Harlan Warde as Maj. Dawson
Kenneth Patterson as General
William F. Leicester as Capt. Hughes 
Gayle Kellogg as Corporal

Critical reception
New York Times critic Bosley Crowther said the film "spins its story vigorously but with little impact. This dissipation of potential tension may be attributed to the fact that the self-effacing bravery displayed here has been in evidence on film before, and with greater effect." Crowther said that even though it was based on fact, "this annal of dedicated men braving dangerous assignments appears to be largely hackneyed deeds out of an old and not too thrilling history."

A New York Daily News critic observed that earlier films about the underground in Europe had presented all the fighters as "heroes and patriots." but that "now, apparently, it can be told that some of the leaders of resistance movements were fighting first for Russia and only incidentally for their native lands." She praised Wilde for an "effective performance."

References

External links 
 

1952 films
1950s war drama films
American war drama films
Films directed by Lewis Seiler
Films scored by Roy Webb
Films about the French Resistance
World War II spy films
Warner Bros. films
Films adapted into comics
1952 drama films
American black-and-white films
1950s English-language films
1950s American films